This is the discography for Mexican pop singer Yuri.

Albums
1978: Tú Iluminas mi Vida
1980: Esperanzas
1981: Llena de dulzura
1983: Yuri: Sí, soy así
1984: Karma Kamaleón
1985: Yo te pido amor
1986: Un corazón herido
1987: Aire
1988: Isla del Sol
1989: Sui Generis
1990: Soy Libre
1992: Obsesiones
1993: Nueva era
1994: Reencuentros
1995: Espejos del Alma
1997: Más Fuerte que la Vida
1998: Huellas
2000: Que tu fe nunca muera
2002: Enamorada
2004: Yuri/A lo Mexicano
2006: Acompáñame
2006: Vive la Historia (DVD)
2008: Mi Hijita Linda
2010: Inusual
2011: Mi Tributo al Festival
2013: Mi Tributo al Festival II
2015: Invencible
2017: Primera Fila

Singles

Other records
1983: Sí, soy así (edited in Spain)
1984: Ni tu ni yo (edited in Spain)
1989: Algo de mi vida (Includes B Sides and Never Officially Edited Songs Previously)
1991: Isla del Sol (Brazil Edition, With 4 Songs In Portuguese)
1994: Reencuentros (Compilation That Includes 3 New Songs)
1998: Mi testimonio (Spoken Album That Includes The Song "Quién soy yo").
2001: En la luz (Compilation Of Christian Themes, With 1 New Song)Collaborations and duets
 Y ahora juntos, with Oscar Athié (1984)
 Cantaré, cantarás, with Latin American Artists (1985)
 Dos en uno, with Jimmy Osmond (1986)
 Ven a cantar, with EMI Cast (1986)
 Esta navidad, with EMI Cast and Melody Cast (1987)
 Hay mil mundos differentes, with EMI Cast (1988)
 A better place /Un lugar mejor, with Don Johnson (1989)
 Píntalo, with Luis Angel (1990)
 Siempre fiel, with Sony Cast (1990)
 Química perfecta, with Luis Enrique (1992)
 Juntos, with Uniko-ko (1994)
 Hey Jude, with Sony Cast (1995)
 Y todo el mundo eres tu, with Tito Enríquez (1995)
 Medley: Alegres cantad, with Susana Zabaleta, Alejandra Ávalos and Sasha Sokol (1995)
 Quimbara, with  Celia Cruz (1997)
 Burundanga, with  Celia Cruz (1997)
 Paz del Alma, with  Torre Fuerte and Rodrigo Espinoza (1997)
 Ven a mi casa esta navidad, with Polygram Cast (1997)
 Hoy que estamos juntos, with Rodrigo Espinoza (1998)
 Estoy aquí, with United Artist For Chiapas (1999)
 Por los buenos mexicanos, with Mexican Artists (2001)
 El último adiós, with Hispanic Artists (2001)
 Lo que soñé, with Rodrigo Espinoza (2001)
 El está al llegar, with  Alex D´Castro (2003)
 Y llegaste tú, with  Mijares (2004)
 Cosas del amor, with  Ana Bárbara (2004)
 Popurrí Juan Gabriel, with  Pandora (2004)
 Que no quede huella, with  Guadalupe Esparza (2004)
 Cuatro vidas, with  Vicente Fernández (2004)
 Esta navidad, with Moderatto, Mijares, Pandora and Sergio Fachelli (2005)
 Acompáñame, Duets CD with  Mijares (2006)
 Hay una respuesta, with Christian Artists (2006)
 Ahora es el tiempo, with Christian Artists (2007)
 Todo mi corazón, with  Los hijos de Sánchez (2008)
 Gracias, with  Kumbia All Starz (2008)
 La múcura, with  Flex (2009)

 Other official recordings 
 Quimbara, Included On the Album of La Manzana Eléctrica 1978
 Adiós Manhattan, Demo Recorded For Gamma In 1978, Published in 1989
 La balada del vagabundo, B Side Of The Single "Tú iluminas mi vida" (1978)
 Siempre hay un mañana, Song Used During Her Performance On The OTI (1979)
 Frente a frente, Included On The South American Version Of "Llena de dulzura" (1981)
 Si, soy así, Included On The Spanish Version Of "Yuri (Yo te amo, te amo)" (1983)
 Tiempos Mejores, Song Used During Her Performance On The OTI (1984)
 No se que pasa, Included On The Spanish Version Of "Karma kamaleon (Ni tú ni yo)" (1984)
 Hoy me siento libre, Included On The Spanish Version Of "Karma kamaleon (Ni tú ni yo)" (1984)
 Campana sobre campana, Included On the Album "Eterna navidad" (1986)
 Las posadas, Included On The Album "Ven a cantar" (1987)
 Las bicycletas adoran el sol, Included On the Album "Erase una vez" (1988)
 Mejor sola, B Side Of The Audio Cassette "Hola-Remix" (1989)
 Cassette de amor, Included On The Album "Algo de mi vida" (1989)
 No sucederá más, Included On The Album "Algo de mi vida" (1989)
 Maquillaje, Song Written By Nacho Cano Included On The Album "Algo de mi vida" (1989)
 El cascabel, Included On The Album "México, voz y sentimiento" (1990)
 Lo poquito que me queda, Included On The Album "México, voz y sentimiento vol. II" (1991)
 Hey hey, Song In Portuguese Included On The Album "Isla del Sol (Brasil Edition)" (1991)
 Nao somos iguais, Song In Portuguese Included On The Album "Isla del Sol (Brasil Edition)" (1991)
 Grito de paixao, Song In Portuguese Included On The Album "Isla del Sol (Brasil Edition)" (1991)
 Todas, Song In Portuguese Included On The Album "Isla del Sol (Brasil Edition)" (1991)
 Qué numerito, Included On The Album "Anímate" (1994)
 El espejo, Song Originally Recorded In 1986, Included On The Album "Por amor y desamor" (1995)
 Obladí obladá, Included On The Album "Hey Jude" (1995)
 La boa, Included On The Album "Nuestro aniversario" (1996)
 Sabor a mí, Included On the Album "Piano, voz y sentimiento" (1997)
 Celebremos, Included On The Album "Israel" (1998)
 Veracruz, Included On The Album "Antología del mariachi vol. 6" (1998)
 Noche criolla, Included On The Album "Antología del mariachi vol. 6" (1998)
 Clave azul, Included On the Album "Antología del mariachi vol. 6" (1998)
 La cumbancha, Incluida En El Album "Antología del mariachi vol. 6" (1998)
 ABCD, Included On The Album "Los cuates de Chabelo" (1999)
 Brillan las estrellas, Included On The Album "Buenas noches" (2006)
 Angelitos de colores, Included On The Album "Buenas noches" (2006)
 Una limosna para este pobre viejo, Included On The Album "Superestrellas en Navidad" (2007)

 Videography 
1982 El pequeño panda de Chapultepec 
1982 Maldita primavera1985 Yo te pido amor1985 Dame un beso1986 Es ella más que yo1986 Campana sobre campana1987 Las bicycletas adoran el sol1987 Las posadas1988 Qué te pasa1988 Cuando baja la marea1988 Hombres al borde de un ataque de celos1988 Hola1988 No puedo más1989 A Better Place / Un lugar mejor (dúo con Don Johnson)
1989 Me tienes que querer1990 Sabes lo que pasa1990 El apagón (2 versiones)1990 Todo mi corazón1992 Decir adiós1992 Química perfecta (dueto con Luis Enrique)1992 Poligamia1993 Detrás de mi ventana1993 Amiga mía1994 1994 Juntos (dúo con Unik-ko)1995 De qué te vale fingir1995 Engáñame1998 Y tú cómo estás1998 Soy feliz2000 Que tu fe nunca muera2002 Ya no vives en mí2005 Callados2006 Hay una respuesta2010 Arrepentida2010 Ya no vives en mí (remix)2011 Estoy Cansada2011 Ay Amor2013 El Triste2013 Tiempos Mejores2014 Invencible2014 Duele (ft. Reik)2015 Ahora2015 Al Bailar (ft. Yandel)2015 Presa''

References

Discographies of Mexican artists
Latin pop music discographies